Peter Rodney Hinds (born 8 June 1962) is a Barbadian former professional footballer. After playing top division football in Japan, Scotland and Portugal, Hinds spent several years playing in Northern Ireland, where he is currently manager of Northern Amateur Football League club 1st Bangor Old Boys.

Playing career

Hinds was born in Saint Peter, Barbados and moved to England in his youth. After a stint in the British Army he played non-League football as a striker for Enfield and Bishop Auckland. Next, Hinds joined Japan Soccer League team Fujita Kogyo. In 1989, he moved to Scottish League Premier Division club Dundee United where he scored twice in 18 appearances.

In 1990 Hinds moved to C.S. Marítimo of the Portuguese Divisão I, where his first season saw him finish as the club's top scorer with 10 goals in 30 games. The following season wasn't as prolific, with Hinds managing to notch up only four goals in 26 appearances. In 1992, he moved to Divisão I rivals Gil Vicente, but again, Hinds wasn't able to repeat his form of two seasons past. He scored just three goals in 19 appearances.

Hinds soon disappeared from the top level and has most recently been playing in the lower leagues of Northern Ireland, for PSNI from 2001—2003, Brantwood (2003—2005) and Knockbreda (2006—2007), prior to joining 1st Bangor Old Boys.

Now plays for Brentwood in the Down Area League. Whoem Brentwood are the current Champions.

References

External links

1962 births
Living people
Barbadian footballers
Barbadian expatriate footballers
Expatriate footballers in England
Expatriate footballers in Japan
Expatriate footballers in Scotland
Expatriate footballers in Portugal
Barbadian expatriate sportspeople in Portugal
Barbadian expatriate sportspeople in the United Kingdom
Expatriate association footballers in Northern Ireland
Dundee United F.C. players
C.S. Marítimo players
Gil Vicente F.C. players
Japan Soccer League players
Scottish Football League players
Primeira Liga players
Brantwood F.C. players
PSNI F.C. players
Shonan Bellmare players
Association football forwards
Knockbreda F.C. players
Barbadian expatriate sportspeople in Japan
20th-century British Army personnel